Ha Han-sol (born 24 November 1993) is a South Korean sabre fencer.

He participated at the 2019 World Fencing Championships, winning a medal.

References

External links

1993 births
Living people
South Korean male sabre fencers
World Fencing Championships medalists